The Grapevine Women's Tennis Classic was a professional tennis tournament held on outdoor hard courts at the Hilton DFW Lakes Executive Conference Center in Grapevine, Texas, United States. It was classified as a $50,000 ITF Women's Circuit event. The tournament was held from 2009 to 2011, with there being two different editions in 2010.

Past finals

Singles

Doubles

References 
2009 Results
2010 (July) Results
2010 (November) Results
2011 Results

Hard court tennis tournaments in the United States
ITF Women's World Tennis Tour
Grapevine, Texas
Tennis tournaments in Texas
Recurring sporting events established in 2009
Recurring sporting events disestablished in 2011
Defunct tennis tournaments in the United States